The Daily Review is an Australian news website that covers arts and entertainment. The site was launched in 2013 by Private Media as an arts-focused offshoot of Crikey. Its readership is primarily from Melbourne and Sydney, and its reporting has been sourced by NPR and The Conversation, among others.

In 2017, Opera Australia reportedly ordered a deputy editor at the publication removed from the company’s complimentary media ticketing list after the website had published several articles critical of Opera Australia's management.

References

External links
 

Australian news websites
2017 establishments in Australia